Dil Vil Pyaar Vyaar is a 2014 Punjabi Family drama film directed by Manjeet Maan featuring Gurdas Maan, Neeru Bajwa, Jassi Gill, Manav Vij and Rajiv Thakur.

Plot

Dil Vil Pyaar Vyaar is a story of four brothers where the eldest one Agam (Gurdas Maan) takes care of his younger brothers and wants them to get married, but the brothers disapprove of this and want Agam to get married first who in turn is hesitant of going for marriage because of an incident that took place in his life years ago.

Cast

 Gurdas Maan as Agam
 Neeru Bajwa as Prabhjeet
 Juhi Chawla as Simran
 Manav Vij as Biba
 Jassi Gill as Deepa
 Rajiv Thakur as Raja
 Raj Jhinger as Channi
 Meher Vij as Simran
 Shruti Sodhi
 Khushdeed Maan as Jasjeet

Soundtrack

The soundtrack of Dil Vil Pyaar Vyaar consists of 8 songs composed by Gurdas Maan and Jatinder Shah, the lyrics to which were provided by Kumaar, Abdul Sattar Niazi and Gurdas Maan himself.

Awards and nominations

References

Punjabi-language Indian films
2010s Punjabi-language films
Films scored by Jatinder Shah